was a village located in Higashimatsuura District, Saga Prefecture, Japan.

Kitahata was established in 1889 (Meiji 22) as a union of small hamlets. As of 2003, the village had an estimated population of 4,679 and a population density of 176.03 persons per km². The total area was 26.58 km².

On January 1, 2005, Kitahata, along with the towns of Chinzei, Hamatama, Hizen, Kyūragi, Ōchi and Yobuko (all from Higashimatsuura District), was merged into the expanded city of Karatsu.

The town hosts the Karatsu City Hospital Kitahata. Kitahata has a Junior High School. It also runs the Kitahata Furusato Summer Festival in July.

References
 Kitahata Village History, Vol 1, 1961 (北波多村史)
 Kitahata Village History, Vol 3, 1963 (北波多村史)
 Kitahata Village History: A Step toward Buraku Liberation Kitahata Village History, 1986 (北波多村部落史: 部落解放への步み)

External links

English pages:
 Saga JET Pages (Kitahata page)
 Minshuku Kitahata
 Kishidake Kiln, Kitahata
 Kishitake Castle Ruins

Japanese pages:
 Karatsu City page for Kitahata
 YouTube for Kitahata

Dissolved municipalities of Saga Prefecture